The HAHN Group GmbH is a group of companies that specialize in industrial automation and robotics. There are about 1600 employees at 29 locations in Austria, China, Croatia, Czech Republic, Germany, the United Kingdom, India, Israel, Mexico, Switzerland, Sweden, Turkey and the United States. The headquarters are located in Rheinböllen, Germany.

History 
In 2014 the RAG-Stiftung Beteiligungsgesellschaft acquired a majority stake in HAHN Automation. 

Hahn Holding GmbH was established on November 29, 2016. At this point HAHN Automation, WEMO Automation, HAHN Robotics and Waldorf Technik belonged to the company. On November 24, 2017 they changed the name to HAHN Group. Invotec got into the HAHN Group in 2017. In 2018 GeKu Automatisierungssysteme, Kitov Systems, Rethink Robotics, HAHN RobShare and HAHN Automation UK joined the group. DFT Maschinenbau, Walther Systemtechnik, HAHN Ruhrbotics and REI Automation entered the HAHN Group in 2019. DAHL Automation joined the HAHN Group in 2020. In 2021 Rethink Robotics and HAHN RobShare moved from the HAHN Group into the newly incorporated United Robotics Group, which is a subsidiary of RSBG Automation & Robotics Technologies.

As of April 1, 2021, Philipp Unterhalt takes over the role as CEO of the HAHN Group and will continue to drive the growth and diversification of the company network along with Axel Greschitz (CFO).

Companies and brands

HAHN Automation 
HAHN Automation is an internationally operating manufacturer of special machinery and is specialized in the automation of the assembly and testing processes related to rubber, plastic and metal parts. Currently about 800 employees are working at 11 locations in China, Great Britain, Croatia, Mexico, Austria, Switzerland, Czech Republic, Turkey, and the United States. The company's headquarters are situated in Rheinböllen, Germany.

WEMO Automation 
WEMO Automation produces Linear-Robot-Systems and Automation cells for the plastic industry worldwide. The company's headquarters are situated in Värnamo, Sweden, with other plants in Germany and India.

HAHN Robotics 
HAHN Robotics is a company that is specialized in collaborative robotics. They distribute robots, regardless of manufacturers, as for example the robots of MiR and Rethink Robotics. Furthermore, they offer feasibility studies and consulting for a collaborative automation in factories. The company's headquarters are situated in Reinheim, Germany and they are operating also in Switzerland and Belgium.

Aldebaran 
Aldebaran, formerly SoftBank Robotics, was acquired in 2021 and is part of United Robotics Group.

Waldorf Technik 
Waldorf Technik is specialized in the automation of injection molding with expertise in medical, packaging and barrier technology. It is headquartered in Engen, Germany and currently employs close to 100 staff.

Invotec 
Invotec designs and builds automation solutions for assembly, test, and inspection equipment for medical device manufacturers. Invotec Inc. has its headquarters in Miamisburg, OH, United States. Invotec GmbH opened its doors in Villingen-Schwenningen, Germany in December 2018.

GeKu Automatisierungssysteme 
GeKu Automatisierungsysteme specializes in the automation technology for plastics, rubber and metal processing industry. They design and build system robots, handling technology, conveying and packing systems as well as quality assurance systems. GeKu is located in Diepenau, Germany.

Kitov Systems 
Kitov Systems develops fully automated visual inspection solutions and focuses on high-end electronics manufacturing, automotive, medical devices, defense and aerospace industries. The company is located in Petah Tikva in Israel.

Rethink Robotics 
Rethink Robotics builds the smart cobot Sawyer and the software Intera. Since the HAHN Group bought the company's assets in 2018, Rethink Robotics is a German company with its headquarters situated in Bochum. In 2021 it became part of the newly incorporated United Robotics Group.

HAHN Robshare 
HAHN Robshare is a company that is specialized in renting collaborative robots. Regardless of manufacturers, they work for example with cobots of Doosan Robotics, Mobile Industrial Robots (MiR), Universal Robots, WEMO and the collaborative robot Sawyer from Rethink Robotics. In 2021 it became part of the newly incorporated United Robotics Group.

DFT Maschinenbau 
DFT Maschinenbau is specialized in the automated assembly and test technology. Among others they produce pumps, braking systems, exhaust aftertreatment systems, transmissions, turbocharger, automotive electrics and safetyboxes for the automotive industry. DFT is located in Kremsmünster, Austria and has about 100 employees.

Walther Systemtechnik 
The company designs and builds systems for various dosing applications for the automotive industry, pharma industry, food industry, rubber industry, chemical industry and metal processing industry. The company is located in Germersheim, Germany.

HAHN Digital 
In 2019 the HAHN Group established HAHN Digital to offer their customers digital services. This step is towards industry 4.0 to digitalize the industry. The digital services of HAHN Digital include below others customer services via augmented reality (EVE) but also the visual inspection systems of Kitov.

HAHN Ruhrbotics 
HAHN Ruhrbotics is located in Recklinghausen, Germany and has all its customers in the Ruhr area. The company designs and builds automation systems and supports other companies with the commissioning of collaborative and industrial robots as well as the application of AI-based image processing systems.

REI Automation 
REI Automation is specialized in the development and building of customized industrial plants like assembly lines, robot cells and special machinery systems in the medical, nuclear, consumer goods, electronic and automotive industry. The headquarters of the company are located in Columbia, South Carolina.

DAHL Automation 
DAHL Automation GmbH concentrates on the cross-sector automation of small and medium-sized companies with a collaborative approach. The company is based in Meinerzhagen, Germany.

References

External links 
 Website
 Hahn Group – Firmen und Marken

Companies based in Rhineland-Palatinate
German brands